Lviv Bus is a public bus transport system in Lviv, serviced by standard (12m) and medium (8m) buses, operating in the "regular" mode, and is the main type of public transport by ridership, number of routes and units of rolling stock. As of 2018, the executive committee of the Lviv City Council (LCC) has approved 65 city routes that are served by 5 operators identified in the competition in October 2018 (competition repeats each 5 years). Through Lviv also several dozen suburban routes(range # 100-900) run approved by the Lviv Regional State Administration (LRSA).

In 2010, bus transport in the city carried 128.9 million passengers, accounting for 63.1% of all ridership in the city according to Regional Office of State Service of Statistics of Ukraine.

The Office for Transport of Lviv City Council (OT LCC) is the organizer of public transportation in Lviv. Legal regulation of the passenger transportation industry is carried out by the Law of Ukraine On Automobile Transport, Resolution No. 1081 of the Cabinet of Ministers of Ukraine, and other by-laws of Ukraine. The bus system in Ukraine works as self-profitable (no PSO contract or special subsidy) with elements of shadow economy — each day the driver should earn money for the operator and for himself. Officially, in most companies bus drivers works for a minimum wage, and the rest of the salary they "earn" comes directly from fares (passengers cash payments). The city budget compensate a small sum (approx. UAH 70 Mio per year) for bus operators only for privileged passengers (such as pensioners), but there is no exact count of such persons traveled.

The Office for Transport of Lviv City Council organizes competition for bus urban routes each 5 years according to Resolution No. 1081 of the Cabinet of Ministers of Ukraine. The competition procedure is the same for all transportation organizers in Ukraine, it involves the collection of applications in the approved form and the awarding of points (according to the detailed criteria outlined in the government decree) to each participant of the competition. Contestants are usually the same carriers (operators) with the same buses. It is important to note that the competition is not a bidding procedure, as in the case of EU countries, Switzerland or Norway. According to the results of the competition, none of the parties bears any financial obligations. The city council compensates carriers for part of the money for the transportation of privileged passengers and pensioners, but this sum does not cover all the necessary costs for a proper transportation service. As a result, there are constant problems and low quality of bus service.

History 
In the first decade after WW1, life in Lviv improved: in the 1920s, there was an increase in the city's population and territory: both the construction of new districts and the joining of neighboring villages to the city, which resulted in a large-scale expansion of the city's borders in 1931. To connect with the new districts, the magistrate decided to introduce a bus service in the city. On April 12, 1928, the first bus route "A" began operating from Sknyliv Airport to Saint Elizabeth church (Kropyvnytskoho sq., since 1992).

As of 2022 the bus network of Lviv (and its settlements) consists of 65 routes which are serviced by 5 operators: 4 private and 1 communal bus enterprise of Lviv city council. Only 50 and 47 out of 65 routes were in service in 2021 and 2022.

Rolling stock 
Lviv communal bus enterprise No. 1 service routes mostly with 190 standard low-floor buses of Electron A185 and MAZ 203 which are 12m long (without AC) and can carry up to 100 passengers. Private operators use approximately 180 medium size buses (locally called "marshrutka") of local producers (on foreign chassis TATA, Isuzu etc.) e.g. Bogdan A092 (Isuzu), Etalon BAZ A079 (TATA) and familiar models. They do not have low floor, AC, and are extremely worn (aged from 10 to 16 years). ATP-1 also hired subcontractors for serving several routes with medium buses (Bogdan A092, Etalon BAZ A079).

Fares 
From June 2, 2022, the fare has been raised to UAH 15 which is approximately US$0,40 or EUR 0,40 as for September 2022. The reason for the increase is due to the shortage and increase in the price of fuel, which was caused by Russian aggression against Ukraine. In the bus people pay directly to the driver every time they use it. There are no monthly pass, discounts or time-tickets. The majority of the passengers in buses don't take the tickets as conductors (ticket control person or service) are absent.

Maps and diagrams

Lviv Buses Photogallery

References

Links 
Eway — Interactive map of Lviv public transport routes

Photo gallery of buses in Lviv

Lviv will announce a Tender for the purchase of 100 city busses

In Lviv, the cost of travel on public transport is significantly higher

HOW INCREASE IN FUEL PRICES IMPACTS THE LVIV TRANSPORT (2022)

Mobility in Lviv - Buses. Transformative Urban Mobility Initiative (2022)

Transport in Lviv
Bus transport by city